Emily Critchley (born 1980) is an experimental writer and academic. She has had poems long-listed for the National Poetry Competition (2020) and Highly Commended by the Forward Prize for poetry (2018). She was a runner-up in the Pacuare Nature Poetry Competition, Trinidad and Tobago (2015) and winner of the national Jane Martin Prize for Poetry (2011), the John Kinsella-Tracy Ryan Prize for Poetry (University of Cambridge, 2004) and The Other Prize for best original play (University of Cambridge, 2003). Her work has been translated into several languages.

Background
Critchley was born in Athens, Greece and grew up in Dorset, England. Her mother is Greek. She states that her influences include T. S. Eliot, the Language poets, Gertrude Stein, and John Berryman among others.

Critchley's writing has been compared to that of Denise Riley, Leslie Scalapino, and Mina Loy. She has been performing her work since 2000. In 2004 she won the John Kinsella-Tracy Ryan prize for poetry and in 2011 was joint winner of the national Jane Martin Prize for Poetry.

Critchley gained her BA from the University of Oxford, her MA in Modern and Contemporary Poetry at Bristol University, and completed a PhD entitled "'[D]oubts, Complications and Distractions': Rethinking the Role of Women in Language Poetry" at the University of Cambridge. She specializes in contemporary experimental writing. In 2006, she organised a three-day international conference for contemporary experimental women's writing at the University of Cambridge and another in 2010 at the University of Greenwich. She is editor of Out of Everywhere 2: Linguistically Innovative Poetry by Women in North America & the UK (Reality Street Press, 2016): the sequel to the poetry anthology published in 1996.  She is co-editor of #MeToo: A Poetry Collective https://www.chicagoreview.org/metoo/

Dr Critchley has been anthologised and interviewed widely and her work has been critically reviewed by, amongst others, Maryam Hessavi in Poetry London (autumn 2019); Peter Riley in The Fortnightly Review (summer, 2019); Isabel Galleymore in Prac Crit, 9 (Aug 2017) and Professor David and Christine Kennedy in Women's Experimental Poetry in Britain 1970 – 2010 (Liverpool University Press, 2013). 

Some of her critical writing includes: 

Afterword to Adelaide Ivánova’s The Hammer and Other Poems (The Poetry Translation Centre, April 2019) https://www.poetrytranslation.org/shop/the-hammer-and-other-poems

Introduction to #MeToo: A Poetry Collective (Chicago Review, Summer, 2018) https://www.chicagoreview.org/metoo/ 

‘W.S. Graham and the Caught Habits of Language’, talk, Newcastle Poetry Festival (summer 2018)

http://www.praccrit.com/interviews/from-ten-thousand-things-interview-by-charlotte-newman/

Entries on Rachel Blau DuPlessis, Rosmarie Waldrop, Jean Day, Vanessa Place, Jennifer Moxley and Alice Notley in The Oxford Companion to Modern Poetry, ed. Ian Hamilton and Jeremy Noel Tod (Oxford University Press, 2013)

‘Denise Riley: “Writing our / Difficulties,”’ Poetry Review (2012)

‘“Moi aussi, Marianne,” or Moving the Targets, being a crypto-ironic response, etc.’ The Claudius App (August 2011) http://theclaudiusapp.com/1-updates-critchley.html

Guest editor of the Journal of British and Irish Innovative Poetry, 3:2: a Greenwich Cross-Genre Festival edition (September 2011)

‘“We live on buoyant fragments” (Andrea Brady): A further selection of American writers from the Greenwich Cross-Genre Festival,’ Cambridge Literary Review, ed. Boris Jardine and Lydia White, 1:5 (May, 2011)

‘A selection of North American women writers from the Greenwich Cross-Genre Festival (July 2010), and some thoughts about their work’, Cambridge Literary Review, ed. Boris Jardine and Lydia White, 1:4 (Michaelmas 2010); pp.9-43 

‘Lyn Hejinian's Faustienne Beings-With’, Stress Fractures, ed., Tom Chivers (London: Penned in the Margins, 2010), pp.55-72 

‘Leslie Scalapino's “alternative ways of seeing”’, Delirious Hem, eds, Cara Benson, Elizabeth Bryant, Catherine Wagner (September 5, 2010) lesliescalapinotribute.wikispaces.com/file/view/Emily+Critchley7.pdf

Review of Lisa Robertson’s Magenta Soul Whip, HOW2 Journal, 3: 3 (2009) http://www.asu.edu/pipercwcenter/how2journal/vol_3_no_3/review/critchley.html

‘“[D]oubts, Complications and Distractions”: Rethinking the Role of Women in Language Poetry’, Hot Gun! ed., Josh Stanley, 1:1 (Summer 09) ), pp.29-49

‘Post-Marginal Positions: Women and the UK Experimental/Avant-Garde Poetry Community’, ed. Cathy Wagner, Jacket magazine, 1:34 (Oct 2007)

‘Dilemmatic boundaries: constructing a poetics of thinking’, Intercapillary Space, ed, Edmund Hardy, 1:4 (November 2006) www.lulu.com/items/volume_34/533000/533882/2/print/533882.pdf

A conference overview + introduction to the Cambridge Contemporary Experimental Women's Poetry Festival (organised by myself in 2006), How2 journal, vol. 3:1 (Summer 2007) http://www.asu.edu/pipercwcenter/how2journal/vol_3_no_1/cambridge/index.html

Critchley is Senior Lecturer in English and Creative Writing at the University of Greenwich. She lives in London.

Published works 
 When I say I Believe Women… (London: bad press, 2006)
 Of All the Surprises (Switzerland: Dusie, 2007)
 Who handles one over the Backlash (Norfolk: Oystercatcher press, 2008)
 Hopeful For Love Are Th' Impoverish'd Of Faith (Southampton: Torque press, 2010)
 Love / All That / & OK: Selected Writing (London: Penned in the Margins, 2011)
 Sonnets for Luke (Liverpool: Holdfire press, 2011)
 IMAGINARYLOVEPOEMS (Paris: Corrupt Press, 2011)
 This is not a True Thing (London: Intercapillary Press, 2013)
 Salutation to Poetry with John Hall (London: Crater Press, 2015)
 Some Curious Thing (London: Barque Press, 2016)
 Ten Thousand Things (Norfolk: Boiler House Press, 2017)
 These. Insuing. Sonnets. with Eric Langley (London: Crater Press, 2018)
 Arrangements (Bristol: Shearsman Books, 2018)
 Alphabet Poem: For Kids! with Michael Kindellan and Alison Honey-Woods (London: Prototype, 2020) https://prototypepublishing.co.uk/artist/emily-critchley/
 Home (London: Prototype, 2021)

References

Sources
 Wheatley, David, Contemporary British Poetry (London: Palgrave, 2015),
 Zword, Megan (2013), Review of Love / All That / & OK, Hix Eros 2 (November 2013)
 Kennedy, David and Kennedy, Christine, Women's Experimental Poetry in Britain 1970–2010: Body, Time & Locale (Liverpool University Press, 2013)
 Skoulding, Zoe, Contemporary Women's Poetry and Urban Space: Experimental Cities (Palgrave Macmillan, 2013)
 Morris, Marianne, 'The Claudius App' (Summer 2011) 
 Spence, Steve, 'Stride Magazine' (Spring 2011) 
 Tuma, Keith, Chicago Review, 53:1 (Spring 2007)

External links 
  (University of Greenwich staff profile) 
 Critchley profile at A-gender 
 Interview (video) 6 October 2010, The other room (8 minutes)  
 Profile and audio files of poems at Authors of the now 
  Morris, Marianne (2011). "A Starling for Morning': critical irony and gender in Emily Critchley's Love / All That / & OK", The Claudius App, 1. 
 Spence, Steve (2011). "Added to the Mix", Stride Magazine. Critichley review 
 " 'Moi aussi, Marianne' or Moving the Targets, being a crypto-ironic response, etc." by Emily Critchley, The Claudius App 1 (August 2011) 
 Emily Critchley, "Post-Marginal Positions: Women & the UK Experimental/Avant-Garde Poetry Community", Jacket magazine, #34 (October 2007)
 .

English women poets
1980 births
Living people
Academics of the University of Greenwich
Alumni of St Peter's College, Oxford
Alumni of the University of Bristol
Alumni of Queens' College, Cambridge
21st-century English poets
21st-century British dramatists and playwrights
English women dramatists and playwrights
21st-century English women